Alex A. Dallman (born May 22, 1992) is an American Republican politician. He is a member of the Wisconsin State Assembly, representing the 41st Assembly district since 2021.  His district comprises most of Green Lake and Marquette counties, as well as the southern half of Adams County.  The district also includes the city of Ripon, in western Fond du Lac County, claimed as the birthplace of the Republican Party.

Early life and education 
Born in Markesan, Wisconsin, in Green Lake County, Dallman is a graduate of Markesan High School.  He attended Edgewood College, in Madison, Wisconsin, and received his bachelor's degree in political science.

Political career 
Dallman began his career working constituent services in the office of Wisconsin congressman Glenn Grothman and still works as an outreach representative for the congressman.  He has been chairman of the Green Lake County Republican Party since 2018.

In February 2020, incumbent 41st district assemblymember Joan Ballweg announced she would forego reelection to the Assembly and would instead seek election to the Wisconsin State Senate in 2020.  Just days later, Dallman announced he would run for the Republican nomination to replace Ballweg in the Wisconsin State Assembly.  Dallman, who faced three opponents in the Republican primary, received the endorsement of former Republican Governor Scott Walker in the days just before the primary.  He prevailed with nearly 50% of the primary vote.  He went on to defeat Democrat Nate Zimdars and independent Jean Bartz in the general election with 60% of the vote.

Personal life and family
Dallman resides in the city of Green Lake, Wisconsin.  He is a member of the Green Lake County Farm Bureau and the Manchester Rod & Gun Club.

Electoral history

Wisconsin Assembly (2020)

| colspan="6" style="text-align:center;background-color: #e9e9e9;"| Republican Primary, August 11, 2020

| colspan="6" style="text-align:center;background-color: #e9e9e9;"| General Election, November 3, 2020

References

External links
 
 
 Campaign website
 41st Assembly District map (2011–2021)

Living people
Republican Party members of the Wisconsin State Assembly
People from Markesan, Wisconsin
People from Green Lake, Wisconsin
Edgewood College alumni
21st-century American politicians
Year of birth uncertain
Date of birth uncertain
1992 births